The 2007 AIHL season was the eighth season of the Australian Ice Hockey League (AIHL). It ran from 14 April 2007 until 26 August 2007, with the Goodall Cup finals following on 1 and 2 September 2007. The Adelaide Avalanche won the V.I.P. Cup after finishing the regular season first in the league standings. The Bears won the Goodall Cup for the second time by defeating the Newcastle North Stars in the final.

Regular season 
The regular season began on 14 April 2007 and ran through to 26 August 2007 before the top four teams advanced to compete in the Goodall Cup playoff series.

Standings 

Notes:

Source

Statistics

Scoring leaders 
List shows the ten top skaters sorted by points, then goals. Current as of 2 September 2007

Leading goaltenders 
Only the top five goaltenders, based on save percentage with a minimum 40% of the team's ice time. Current as of 2 September 2007

Notes 
 The Newcastle North Stars vs Canberra Knights game scheduled for 10 June was postponed by six weeks, due to power cuts caused by wild storms.
 The Adelaide Avalanche set an impressive record on 1 July against West Sydney, scoring four goals (all even-strength) in just thirty-four seconds; the comparable record in the NHL is eighty seconds, and is over sixty years old.
 The inaugural MVP award was presented to Tommy Powell of the Melbourne Ice. While Powell ranked only tenth amongst scorers (23 games, 16 goals, 18 assists), he dominated Melbourne's attack during the first half of the season, when they were at their most successful.

Goodall Cup playoffs 

The 2007 playoffs was scheduled for 1 September with the Goodall Cup final held on 2 September 2007. Following the end of the regular season the top four teams advanced to the playoff series which was held at the Penrith Ice Palace in Penrith, New South Wales. The series was a single game elimination with the two winning semi-finalists advancing to the Goodall Cup final. The Goodall Cup was won by The Bears (2nd title) who defeated the Newcastle North Stars 3–2 in overtime after the two teams finished regulation time locked at 2–2. Bear's goaltender, Pekka Kankaanranta, was named the finals most valuable player (MVP).

All times are UTC+10:00

Semi-finals

Final

References

External links 
 Official website of the AIHL
 NHL.com's report of Opening Weekend by Rick Williams
 NHL.com's report on the Bears Goodall Cup win by Peter Lambert

AIHL 2007 season
AIHL
Australian Ice Hockey League seasons